Nahr-e Abu Shanak (also Romanized as Nahr-e Abū Shānak; also known as Abū Shānak) is a village in Nasar Rural District, Arvandkenar District, Abadan County, Khuzestan Province, Iran. At the 2006 census, its population was 266, in 51 families.

References 

Populated places in Abadan County